The 1987 World Rowing Championships were World Rowing Championships that were held from 29 to 30 August 1987 in Copenhagen, Denmark while it was "outrageously windy".

Medal summary

Medalists at the 1987 World Rowing Championships were:

Men's events

Women's events

References

World Rowing Championships
International sports competitions in Copenhagen
1987 in rowing
Rowing
Rowing competitions in Denmark
August 1987 sports events in Europe
1980s in Copenhagen